The wigeons or widgeons are a group of birds, dabbling ducks currently classified in the genus Mareca along with two other species. There are three extant species of wigeon, in addition to one recently extinct species.

Biology

There are three extant species: the Eurasian wigeon (Mareca penelope), the American wigeon (M. americana) and the Chiloé wigeon (M. sibilatrix). A fourth species, the Amsterdam wigeon (Mareca marecula), became extinct in the 19th century. The wigeons' closest relatives, forming with them the genus Mareca, are the gadwall and the falcated duck.

All three wigeons are similarly shaped, with a steep forehead and bulbous rear to the head. All three wigeon species hybridise in captivity while American and Eurasian wigeons hybridise in the wild. An American wigeon × mallard hybrid has also been recorded.

The American wigeon was formerly called the baldpate by ornithologists, and some people still use that name, especially hunters.

The diet of the wigeon consists mainly of grass leaves (~80%), other food types eaten are seeds (~10%) and roots and stems (~5%).

References

Further reading

External links
Photographs of hybrid wigeons can be seen here and here.

Mareca
Ducks
Wigeons
Bird common names